Guénhaël Huet (born 30 July 1956) is a French politician.  He was a member of the National Assembly of France from 2007 to 2017,
representing Manche's 2nd constituency. He was a member of the Union for a Popular Movement, then the Republicans.

References

1956 births
Living people
The Republicans (France) politicians
People from Manche
Mayors of places in Normandy
Deputies of the 13th National Assembly of the French Fifth Republic
Deputies of the 14th National Assembly of the French Fifth Republic
Paris 2 Panthéon-Assas University alumni